= Onland Lake =

Lake in the state of Wisconsin, United States

- Location within Wisconsin Location within the United States
- Location: Portage County, Wisconsin
- Coordinates: 44°31′13″N 89°16′43″W
- Type: lake
- Etymology: T. O. Onland
- Basin countries: United States
- Surface elevation: 1,096 ft (334 m)

Onland Lake is a lake in the U.S. state of Wisconsin.

Onland Lake was named after T. O. Onland (or Onneland), an early settler.
